Ji-woong, also spelled Ji-ung, is a Korean masculine given name. The meaning differs based on the hanja used to write each syllable of the name. There are 46 hanja with the reading "ji" and two hanja with the reading "woong" on the South Korean government's official list of hanja which may be used in given names.

People with this name include:
Yoon Ji-woong (born 1982), South Korean baseball pitcher
Park Ji-ung (born 1982), stage name Park Hyun-bin, South Korean trot singer
Hwang Ji-woong (born 1989), South Korean football player
Kim Ji-woong (footballer) (born 1989), South Korean football player
Kim Ji-woong (entertainer) (born 1998), South Korean actor and singer

See also
List of Korean given names

References

Korean masculine given names